The 2021 Ballon d'Or (French: Ballon d'Or) was the 65th annual ceremony of the Ballon d'Or, presented by France Football, and recognising the best footballers in the world in 2021.

The nominees for the ceremony were announced on 8 October 2021. Right before the ceremony, France Football announced that along with the Men's and Women's Ballon d'Or, Kopa Trophy and Yashin Trophy, two new awards would be given: the Best Club and Best Striker of the Year.

Lionel Messi won the award for a record-extending seventh time after captaining Argentina to the 2021 Copa America, its first senior international title since 1993. Robert Lewandowski finished second following his record-setting 41-goal season in the 2020–21 Bundesliga campaign, and Jorginho finished third after contributing to 2020–21 UEFA Champions League and UEFA Euro 2020 titles.

Ballon d'Or
The nominees for the awards were announced on 8 October 2021.

Ballon d'Or Féminin

The shortlist for the awards were announced on 8 October 2021.

Kopa Trophy

The nominees for the awards were announced on 8 October 2021.

Yashin Trophy

The nominees for the awards were announced on 8 October 2021.

Striker of the Year

Club of the Year

References

2021
Ballon d'Or
Ballon d'Or